Beremboke is a locality in western central Victoria, Australia.

Beremboke Post Office opened on 1 January 1877 and closed in 1968.

Beremboke Primary School No.1017. 18xx? - 1977, Classified in the Victorian Government Gazette (June 30, 1891) as a 5th class State School.

Teachers:
Mary Bennett,  listed as teacher appointed Sept 1876 (Vic Govt publications)
George William Eastwood. Listed as appointed teacher March 1880, Head Teacher in Vic. Govt. Gazette (1st Jan 1885 & 30 June 1891).

References

Towns in Victoria (Australia)